Longyao County is a county in southwestern Hebei province, China. It was combined from Longping County and Yaoshan County in 1947.

Administrative divisions
The county administers 6 towns and 6 townships.

Towns:
Longyao, Weijiazhuang, Yincun, Shankou, Lianzi, Gucheng

Townships:
Beilou Township, Dongliang Township, Shuangbei Township, Niujiaqiao Township, Qianhuying Township, Dazhangzhuang Township

Climate

References

External links

County-level divisions of Hebei
Xingtai